Saint-Jacques-sur-Darnétal (literally Saint-Jacques on Darnétal) is a commune in the Seine-Maritime department in the Normandy region in north-western France.

Geography

Population

Places of interest
 The church of St. Jacques, dating from the 19th century.
 A 16th-century cemetery cross.
 The chapel at Quévreville la Milon, built in 1828.

See also
Communes of the Seine-Maritime department

References

Communes of Seine-Maritime